P P Savani University is a private university located in  Dhamdod, Kosamba, Surat district, Gujarat, India. The university was established in 2017 through the Gujarat Private Universities (Amendment) Act, 2017, which was passed in March 2017 and also established Swarnim Startup & Innovation University, Karnavati University and Indrashil University. The university is accredited by NAAC B++. The first convocation was held in 2020.

References

Universities in Gujarat
Surat district
Private universities in India
2017 establishments in Gujarat
Educational institutions established in 2017